The following is a list of notable deaths in September 1991.

Entries for each day are listed alphabetically by surname. A typical entry lists information in the following sequence:
 Name, age, country of citizenship at birth, subsequent country of citizenship (if applicable), reason for notability, cause of death (if known), and reference.

September 1991

1
Otl Aicher, 69, German graphic designer and typographer, traffic collision.
Allan Grossman, 80, Canadian politician, cancer.
Luis Negrón López, 82, Puerto Rican politician.
Hannibal Valdimarsson, 88, Icelandic politician.

2
Arnold Chernushevich, 58, Soviet fencer and Olympic medalist.
František Hanus, 75, Czech actor.
Laura Riding, 90, American writer, cardiac arrest.
Alfonso García Robles, 80, Mexican diplomat, Nobel Prize recipient (1982).

3
Jean Bourgoin, 78, French cinematographer (The Longest Day), Oscar winner (1963).
Frank Capra, 94, Italian-American film director (It's a Wonderful Life, Mr. Smith Goes to Washington, It Happened One Night), Oscar winner (1935, 1937, 1939), heart attack.
Eduardo Cordero, 69, Chilean basketball player.
Falk Harnack, 78, German film director.
Daniel Prenn, 86, Polish-German-British tennis player, Alzheimer's disease.

4
Charlie Barnet, 77, American jazz musician.
Henri de Lubac, 95, French cardinal.
Azellus Denis, 84, Canadian politician.
Knud Hallest, 82, Danish film actor.
Tom Tryon, 65, American actor and novelist, stomach cancer.
Dottie West, 58, American country singer, complications from a traffic collision.

5
Raymond Dronne, 83, French resistance fighter during World War II.
Sharad Joshi, 60, Indian poet, writer, and satirist.
Carol Kalish, 36, American writer, editor, and comic book retailer, intracranial aneurysm.
Åke Nilsson, 63, Swedish alpine skier and Olympian.
Alexander Pushnin, 70, Soviet painter.
Peter Slaghuis, 30, Dutch DJ, record producer and remixer, traffic collision.
Princess Fahrelnissa Zeid, 90, Turkish artist.

6
Eugene Bolden, 92, American Olympic swimmer (1920).
Donald Henry Gaskins, 58, American convicted serial killer, execution by electric chair.
Bob Goldham, 69, Canadian ice hockey player.
Mohamad Noah Omar, 93, Malaysian politician.
Alfredo Rizzo, 89, Italian actor.
Robert Stoller, 66, American psychiatrist and researcher , traffic collision.

7
Buddy Banks, 81, American jazz tenor saxophonist, pianist, and bandleader.
Héctor-Neri Castañeda, 66, Guatemalan-American philosopher and publisher.
John Crosby, 79, American media critic, cancer.
John H. Lawrence, 87, American physicist.
Edwin McMillan, 83, American physicist, first to synethesize neptunium, Nobel Prize recipient (1951), complications of diabetes mellitus.
Chintaman Govind Pandit, 96, Indian virologist and writer.
Haakon Pedersen, 84, Norwegian speed skater and Olympian.
Ben Piazza, 58, American actor (Mask, Santa Barbara, The Blues Brothers), AIDS-related cancer.
Ravi Narayana Reddy, 83, Indian communist politician and peasant leader.

8
Odd Bull, 84, Norwegian Air Force general.
Brad Davis, 41, American actor (Midnight Express, Chariots of Fire, Querelle), assisted suicide.
Gordon Gunson, 87, English footballer.
Latif Karimov, 84, Azerbaijani artist.
Alex North, 80, American film composer (A Streetcar Named Desire, Spartacus, Cleopatra), Emmy winner (1976).
Luigi Pareyson, 73, Italian philosopher.
Mack Reynolds, 56, American gridiron football player.
Lou Rosenberg, 87, American baseball player.

9
Concetto Lo Bello, 67, Italian football referee and politician.
Åke Holmberg, 84, Swedish writer and translator.
Efraim Racker, 78, Austrian biochemist, stroke.
Henri H. Stahl, 90, Romanian marxist cultural anthropologist and social historian.

10
Jack Crawford, 83, Australian tennis player.
Jan Józef Lipski, 65, Polish writer and politician.
Eila Pehkonen, 66, Finnish actress.
António Reis, 64, Portuguese film director, screenwriter, and producer.
Michel Soutter, 59, Swiss film director and screenwriter, cancer.

11
Gail Borden, 84, American figure skater and Olympian.
Rudolf Kaiser, 69, German aerospace engineer.
Iosif Lengheriu, 77, Romanian football player.
Wera Liessem, 78, German actress.
Viktor Tegelhoff, 72, Slovak football player and coach.

12
Sir Ewan Forbes, 11th Baronet, 79, Scottish nobleman, general practitioner and farmer.
Saburo Date, 67, Japanese actor.
Milton Harris, 85, American chemist.
Franz Keller, 78, Swiss psychologist.
Feliks Konarski, 84, Polish poet, songwriter, and cabaret performer.
Bruce Matthews, 82, Canadian army officer.
Chris Von Erich, 21, American professional wrestler, suicide.
Harland G. Wood, 84, American biochemist.

13
Baruch Ashlag, 84, Polish rabbi.
Michael Harrison, 84, English detective and fantasy writer.
Robert Irving, 78, British conductor.
Huy Kanthoul, 82, Cambodian politician, Prime Minister.
Erich Kern, 85, Austrian journalist, nazi propagandist during World War II, and a post-war neo-nazi.
Metin Oktay, 55, Turkish football player, traffic collision.
Joe Pasternak, 89, Hungarian-American film director, Parkinson's disease.
Paul Thompson, 84, Canadian ice hockey player.

14
Liu Dagang (chemist), 87, Chinese chemist.
Julie Bovasso, 61, American actress (Saturday Night Fever, The Verdict, Moonstruck), cancer.
Heinz Budde, 65, German politician and member of the Bundestag.
Mieczysław Czechowicz, 60, Polish actor.
John King Fairbank, 84, American historian.
Moshe Goshen-Gottstein, 66, German-Israeli linguist.
Russell Lynes, 80, American art historian.

15
André Baruch, 83, French-American radio host, narrator, and sportscaster.
Antoine Blavier, 77, Belgian football referee.
Đorđe Božović, 35, Serbian mobster and war commander, shot.
Otto Buggisch, 81, German mathematician.
Petronella Burgerhof, 82, Dutch Olympic gymnast (1928).
Smoky Burgess, 64, American baseball player.
John Hoyt, 85, American actor (Blackboard Jungle, Julius Caesar, When Worlds Collide), lung cancer.
Luis Miró, 78, Spanish footballer.
Charles E. Osgood, 74, American psychologist and academic.
K. H. Scheer, 63, German science fiction writer.
Sulkhan Tsintsadze, 66, Georgian composer.

16
Ernest Davies, 89, British journalist, author and politician.
Ronald DeWolf, 57, American writer and critic of scientology, diabetes.
Murilo Rubião, 75, Brazilian writer.
Olga Spessivtseva, 96, Russian ballerina.
Carol White, 48, English actress (Poor Cow, I'll Never Forget What's'isname, The Fixer).

17
Bernhard Bischoff, 84, German historian, paleographer, and philologist.
Zino Francescatti, 89, French violinist.
Frank H. Netter, 85, American surgeon.
Song Shi-Lun, 84, Chinese general.
John Tocher, 65, British trade unionist and communist activist.

18
Leland Bell, 68, American painter, leukemia.
John Anthony Donovan, 80, Canadian-American Roman Catholic bishop, heart ailment.
Harry Sandbach, 88, British academic.
Rob Tyner, 46, American singer (MC5), heart attack.

19
Lydia Cabrera, 92, Cuban-American ethnographer.
Eurico de Freitas, 89, Brazilian athlete and Olympian.
LeRoy Lemke, 55, American politician and lawyer.
Theodore McEvoy, 86, British Royal Air Force officer.

20
Ricardo Arredondo, 42, Mexican boxer.
Anton Besold, 87, German politician.
Richard Holt, 60, British politician.
Chet Morgan, 81, American baseball player and manager.
Steve Peek, 77, American baseball player.
Louis Clyde Stoumen, 74, American photographer, film director and producer, cancer.
Seiichirō Tsuda, 85, Japanese long-distance runner and Olympian.

21
Gordon Bashford, 75, British automotive designer.
Paul Henry Lang, 90, Hungarian-American musicologist and music critic.
Henri Lemoine, 82, French cyclist.
Mirza Masood, 82, Indian field hockey player and Olympic champion.
Ante Paradžik, 48, Croatian politician, assassinated.
Angelo Rossitto, 83, American actor (Freaks).
Álvaro, 59, Brazilian football player and manager.

22
Tino Casal, 41, Spanish singer, songwriter and producer, traffic collision.
Ray Cillien, 52, Luxembourgish Olympic boxer (1960).
Louis Dugauguez, 73, French football player and football manager.
Yevgeni Ivanovski, 73, Soviet general.
Durga Khote, 86, Indian actress.

23
Charles V. Dingley, 51, American pornographic film and B movie producer, screenwriter, and director.
Harriet Hammond, 91, American silent film actress.
Yue-Kong Pao, 72, Hong Kong businessman.
Harold Phelps, 88, American long-distance runner.
Keith Robertson, 77, American writer, cancer.
Philippus Vethaak, 76, Dutch cyclist.

24
Yusif Aliyev, 21, Azerbaijani soldier and war hero, killed in action.
Bolesław Banaś, 79, Polish Olympic fencer (1948).
Peter Bellamy, 47, English singer, suicide.
Mary Lawrence, 73, American actress, pneumonia.
Dom Orejudos, 58, American choreographer, AIDS.
Dr. Seuss, 87, American children's author (The Cat in the Hat, How the Grinch Stole Christmas!, Green Eggs and Ham''), cancer.
Joyce Steele, 82, Australian politician.

25
LeRoy H. Anderson, 85, American politician, member of the U.S. House of Representatives (1957–1961).
Klaus Barbie, 77, German-French war criminal, cancer.
Viviane Romance, 79, French actress.
Anita Traversi, 54, Swiss singer.
Stanley Waters, 71, Canadian politician.
Ted A. Wells, 84, American aircraft engineer.

26
Leonard J. Chabert, 58, American politician.
Helmut Kohl, 48, Austrian football referee and butcher, cancer.
Benjamin A. Smith II, 75, American politician, member of the U.S. Senate (1960–1962).
Billy Vaughn, 72, American singer, peritoneal carcinoma.

27
Roy Fuller, 79, English writer.
Garry Glenn, 36, American songwriter, kidney failure.
Richard Goldner, 83, Romanian-Australian violist, pedagogue and inventor.
Floyd Huddleston, 73, American songwriter, screenwriter, and television producer.
Joe Hulme, 87, English football player and cricket player.
Stefan Kisielewski, 80, Polish writer, composer and politician.
Eryk Lipiński, 83, Polish artist.
Oona O'Neill, 66, American socialite, widow of Charlie Chaplin, pancreatic cancer.
Roberto Rojas, 35, Peruvian football player, traffic collision.
Alois Vansteenkiste, 63, Belgian racing cyclist.
Øyvind Vennerød, 72, Norwegian filmmaker.

28
Eugène Bozza, 86, French composer and violinist.
Clifford Campbell, 99, Jamaican politician, governor-general (1962–1973).
Olin Hatfield Chilson, 87, American district judge of the American District Court for the District of Colorado.
Miles Davis, 65, American jazz musician, intracerebral hemorrhage.
Ellic Howe, 81, British author.
Barbara Rose Johns, 56, American civil rights activist, bone cancer.
Peter McKennan, 73, Scottish football player.
Shankar Guha Niyogi, 48, Indian labor leader, murdered.
Dilgo Khyentse Tashi Peljor, 81, Bhutanese Buddhist spiritual teacher and poet.
A. L. Philpott, 72, American politician.

29
Zelimir Bakša, 34, Yugoslav People's Army officer, killed in action.
Henry Joseph Kelliher, 95, New Zealand businessman.
Roger Lafontant, 60, Haitian military leader and politician.
Ed Moriarty, 78, American baseball player.
Lou Nova, 78, American boxer and actor, cancer.
Grace Zaring Stone, 100, American novelist and short-story writer.
Yury Veksler, 51, Soviet and Russian cinematographer.

30
Osman Alyanak, 79-80, Turkish actor and footballer.
Sven Barthel, 88, Swedish writer, journalist, theatre critic and translator.
Shmuel Gonen, 61, Israeli general.
William Albert Hiltner, 77, American astronomer.
King Levinsky, 81, American heavyweight boxer.
Nancy Welford, 87, British-American actress.
Toma Zdravković, 52, Yugoslav singer, prostate cancer.
Claire Zeisler, 88, American fiber artist.

References 

1991-09
 09